In discrete calculus the indefinite sum operator (also known as the antidifference operator), denoted by  or , is the linear operator, inverse of the forward difference operator . It relates to the forward difference operator as the indefinite integral relates to the derivative. Thus

More explicitly, if , then

If F(x) is a solution of this functional equation for a given f(x), then so is F(x)+C(x) for any periodic function C(x) with period 1. Therefore, each indefinite sum actually represents a family of functions. However, due to the Carlson's theorem, the solution equal to its Newton series expansion is unique up to an additive constant C. This unique solution can be represented by formal power series form of the antidifference operator: .

Fundamental theorem of discrete calculus

Indefinite sums can be used to calculate definite sums with the formula:

Definitions

Laplace summation formula

where  are the Cauchy numbers of the first kind, also known as the Bernoulli Numbers of the Second Kind.

Newton's formula

where  is the falling factorial.

Faulhaber's formula

provided that the right-hand side of the equation converges.

Mueller's formula
If  then

Euler–Maclaurin formula

Choice of the constant term
Often the constant C in indefinite sum is fixed from the following condition.

Let

Then the constant C is fixed from the condition

 

or

 

Alternatively, Ramanujan's sum can be used:

 

or at 1

 

respectively

Summation by parts

Indefinite summation by parts:

Definite summation by parts:

Period rules

If  is a period of function  then

If  is an antiperiod of function , that is  then

Alternative usage

Some authors use the phrase "indefinite sum" to describe a sum in which the numerical value of the upper limit is not given:

In this case a closed form expression F(k) for the sum is a solution of

which is called the telescoping equation. It is the inverse of the backward difference  operator.
It is related to the forward antidifference operator using the fundamental theorem of discrete calculus described earlier.

List of indefinite sums

This is a list of indefinite sums of various functions. Not every function has an indefinite sum that can be expressed in terms of elementary functions.

Antidifferences of rational functions

where , the generalized to real order Bernoulli polynomials.

where  is the polygamma function.

where  is the digamma function.

Antidifferences of exponential functions

Particularly,

Antidifferences of logarithmic functions

Antidifferences of hyperbolic functions

where  is the q-digamma function.

Antidifferences of trigonometric functions

where  is the q-digamma function.

where  is the normalized sinc function.

Antidifferences of inverse hyperbolic functions

Antidifferences of inverse trigonometric functions

Antidifferences of special functions

where  is the incomplete gamma function.

where  is the falling factorial.

(see super-exponential function)

See also
Indefinite product
Time scale calculus
List of derivatives and integrals in alternative calculi

References

Further reading
 "Difference Equations: An Introduction with Applications", Walter G. Kelley, Allan C. Peterson, Academic Press, 2001, 
 Markus Müller. How to Add a Non-Integer Number of Terms, and How to Produce Unusual Infinite Summations
 Markus Mueller, Dierk Schleicher. Fractional Sums and Euler-like Identities
 S. P. Polyakov. Indefinite summation of rational functions with additional minimization of the summable part. Programmirovanie, 2008, Vol. 34, No. 2.
 "Finite-Difference Equations And Simulations", Francis B. Hildebrand, Prenctice-Hall, 1968

Mathematical analysis
Indefinite sums
Finite differences
Linear operators in calculus
Non-Newtonian calculus